The 2020 Tour des Alpes-Maritimes et du Var was a road cycling stage race that took place from 21 to 23 February 2020. The race was rated as a 2.1 event as part of the 2020 UCI Europe Tour, and was the 52nd edition of the Tour des Alpes-Maritimes et du Var, which was known as the Tour du Haut Var prior to 2020.

Teams 
Eight UCI WorldTeams, seven UCI ProTeams, and three UCI Continental teams made up the eighteen teams that participated in the race.

UCI WorldTeams

 
 
 
 
 
 
 
 
 

UCI ProTeams

 
 
 
 
 
 
 
 

UCI Continental Teams

Route

Stages

Stage 1 
21 February 2020 — Le Cannet to Grasse,

Stage 2
22 February 2020 — Pégomas to Col d'Èze,

Stage 3
23 February 2020 — La Londe-les-Maures to Toulon,

Classification leadership table 
In the 2020 Tour du Haut Var, four different jerseys were awarded. For the general classification, calculated by adding each cyclist's finishing times on each stage, the leader received a yellow jersey. This classification was considered the most important of the race, and the winner of the classification was considered the winner of the race.

Additionally, there was a points classification, which awarded a green jersey. In the points classification, cyclists received points for finishing in the top 15 in a mass-start stage. For winning a stage, a rider earned 25 points, with 20 for second, 16 for third, 14 for fourth, 12 for fifth, 10 for sixth, then 1 point fewer per place down to 1 for 15th place. Points towards the classification could also be accrued at intermediate sprint points during each stage. There was also a mountains classification, the leadership of which was marked by a red jersey. In the mountains classification, points were won by reaching the top of a climb before other cyclists, with more points available for the higher-categorised climbs.

The fourth jersey represented the young rider classification, marked by a white jersey. This was decided in the same way as the general classification, but only riders born after 1 January 1995 were eligible to be ranked in the classification. There was also a classification for teams, in which the times of the best three cyclists per team on each stage were added together; the leading team at the end of the race was the team with the lowest total time.

Final classification standings

General classification

Points classification

Mountains classification

Young rider classification

Team classification

References

External links 
 

Tour des Alpes-Maritimes et du Var
Tour des Alpes-Maritimes et du Var
2020